Çerkes Küçük Osman Pasha, also known as Uthman Pasha Abu Tawq (died 1727), was an Ottoman statesman. He served as the wali (governor) of the Sidon and Damascus eyalets (provinces) in the early 18th century.

Biography
In Damascus, Osman Pasha (known by the Damascenes as "Abu Tawq") served twice in 1719-1721 and 1723-1725, and was known to be a particularly oppressive governor, who, with the use of his paramilitary forces, extorted the inhabitants of the city and its countryside. He served as governor of Sidon in 1717-1718 and 1725-1726 (his son Hafiz Ahmad Pasha was wali of Sidon in 1723-1725). Osman Pasha governed both provinces in his last term, but resided in Sidon and entrusted the administration of Damascus with a deputy governor.

Damascene anger towards his heavy-handed rule precipitated a popular revolt led by the Hanafi mufti, Khalil al-Bakri, which ultimately led to Osman Pasha's dismissal from the governorship of Damascus; al-Bakri persuaded Sultan Ahmed III that Osman Pasha was unfit to govern the city. Osman Pasha was replaced by Ismail Pasha al-Azm, the first of many al-Azm family members to govern Damascus. Osman Pasha continued to serve in Sidon until he was replaced by Köprülü Abdullah Pasha. Osman Pasha died in 1727. His son Ahmad Pasha later served a second term as governor of Sidon in 1730-1734.

References

Bibliography

1727 deaths
17th-century births
18th-century people from the Ottoman Empire
People from the Ottoman Empire of Circassian descent
Ottoman governors of Damascus
Ottoman governors of Sidon